The 2008–09 Arizona State Sun Devils women's basketball team will represent Arizona State University in the 2008–09 NCAA Division I women's basketball season. The Sun Devils were coached by Charli Turner Thorne. The Sun Devils are a member of the Pacific-10 Conference and attempted to win the NCAA championship.

Offseason

Exhibition

Preseason WNIT

Regular season

Roster

Schedule

Pacific-10 Tournament
Quarterfinals
USC 70, Arizona State 65
March 13: Heather Oliver scored 17 points, and Camille LeNoir had 18 as Southern California beat Arizona State 70-65 in the quarterfinals of the Pac-10 tournament. The Trojans shot 52.9 percent and made 10 3-pointers. It was only the second time a six seed had beaten a third seed in the tournament.
Lauren Lacey had 14 points and Danielle Orsillo 17 points and seven rebounds for the Sun Devils. With less than 4 minutes remaining, Arizona State was behind by three points but was unable to win the game.

Player stats

Postseason

NCAA basketball tournament
Arizona State 58, Georgia 47
Arizona State 63, Florida State 58
Arizona State 84, Texas A&M 69
Connecticut 83, Arizona State 64

Awards and honors

Team players drafted into the WNBA

See also
2008-09 Arizona State Sun Devils men's basketball team

References

External links
Official Site

Arizona State Sun Devils women's basketball seasons
2008–09 NCAA Division I women's basketball season
Arizona State
Arizonia
Arizonia